Seymour is a town located in New Haven County, Connecticut, United States. The population was 16,748 at the 2020 census. Seymour is bordered by the towns of Oxford and Beacon Falls to the north, Bethany and Woodbridge to the east, Ansonia and Derby to the south, and Shelton to the west.

History
Seymour was incorporated as a town in May 1850, and was named for Governor Thomas H. Seymour.

The area that now encompasses the lands of the town was originally part of the town of Derby, which in turn was a part of Milford.  The downtown portion of what is now Seymour was eventually called Humphreysville, named after Revolutionary War hero David Humphreys, aide-de-camp to General George Washington. Humphreys had purchased a factory in what is the downtown portion of the town, which produced scythes and other tools as well as wool products from the sheep he had imported.

In 1836, Humphreysville was incorporated as a borough within the town of Derby by the General Assembly.  Upon the creation of the town of Seymour in 1850, the borough government was dis-incorporated.

Emergency services
The Town of Seymour, CT has its own police department, 2 fire companies, and an ambulance association.

The Police Chief is John Bucherati.  The Police Department currently operates out of its headquarters located at 11 Franklin Street.  The department was previously located at 4 Wakeley Street (located behind the Citizens' Engine Co. 2 building and is now the headquarters of the Seymour Ambulance Association).

The Chief of the Fire Department is Michael Lombardi who is assisted by three assistant chiefs.  The Department consists of two fire companies each led by one captain and two lieutenants.  The Fire Marshal's is located at the Town Hall and is staffed by two full-time employees, The Fire Marshal, Timothy Willis and Deputy Fire Marshal as well as several volunteer fire inspectors.

The Citizens' Engine Company No. 2 is located on DeForest Street with its primary response area being the downtown and east side of the town.  Citizens' Engine was organized in August 1884 when the town purchased a Button steam powered fire engine.  The original fire company, which was organized in 1882, was later disbanded and the present fire company was organized and named in honor of the town's citizens (the company adopted the number 2 since it was the second fire company to exist in town).  The current firehouse was erected in the 1880s and a few years later the hose / bell tower was struck by lightning, which severely damaged it; the tower was then dismantled and rebuilt.  The current apparatus bay addition was erected in 1976.  The Citizens' operate two engines, a heavy rescue, a tower-ladder and a utility truck.

The Great Hill Hose Company was organized in 1947 to help improve fire protection to Seymour's rapidly growing Great Hill and Housatonic River area.  Since the Citizens' Engine Company was located "downtown" it took quite some time for the firefighters and apparatus to reach the west side area.  The Company was first located on Great Hill Road near the old Grange building.  Since the Great Hill area did not have the luxury of fire hydrants, the company utilized ponds and also tanker trucks that carried water.  Since the 1950s the Great Hill area continued to grow with new homes and the present high school and middle school buildings.  The Great Hill Hose Company operates two fire engines, a water tanker truck, a heavy rescue truck, a rescue boat and two utility vehicles.

Seymour Ambulance Association was organized in 1969 and incorporated as a non-profit entity in 1972.  The command structure consists of one chief, one deputy chief, one assistant chief, one captain, one training coordinator, and two lieutenants. The current Chief is Bryan Ryan.  The S.A.A. originally operated its ambulances from various locations and was quartered in the Citizens' firehouse using the easternmost portion of the building for several years.  The organization is currently quartered at 4 Wakeley Street, the building formerly housing the Seymour Police Department.

Geography

Named localities within Seymour include Bungay, Cedar Ridge District, Clifton, Garden City, Great Hill, Promise Land, Skokorat, Squantuck, and Amity.

Demographics

As of the census of 2010, there were 16,540 people, 6,654 households, and 4,453 families residing in the town. The racial makeup of the town was 94.75% White, 1.35% African American, 0.21% Native American, 1.77% Asian, 0.02% Pacific Islander, 1.04% from other races, and 0.87% from two or more races. Hispanic or Latino of any race were 3.04% of the population.

There were 6,155 households, out of which 31.8% had children under the age of 18 living with them, 55.5% were married couples living together, 9.5% had a female householder with no husband present, and 31.6% were non-families. 26.8% of all households were made up of individuals, and 10.8% had someone living alone who was 65 years of age or older.  The average household size was 2.49 and the average family size was 3.05.

In the town, the population was spread out, with 23.9% under the age of 18, 6.3% from 18 to 24, 32.6% from 25 to 44, 22.9% from 45 to 64, and 14.4% who were 65 years of age or older.  The median age was 38 years. For every 100 females, there were 94.3 males.  For every 100 females age 18 and over, there were 92.0 males.

The median income for a household in the town was $52,408, and the median income for a family was $65,012. Males had a median income of $46,171 versus $32,186 for females. The per capita income for the town was $24,056.  About 3.6% of families and 3.7% of the population were below the poverty line, including 4.8% of those under age 18 and 3.5% of those age 65 or over.

Arts and culture

Museums and other points of interest
Great Hill Cemetery, founded in the 18th century.

On the National Register of Historic Places

 Downtown Seymour Historic District: Roughly bounded by the Naugatuck River, Main, Wakeley, and DeForest Streets (added September 25, 1983)
 Sanford-Humphreys House: 61–63 West St. (added June 11, 1982)
 Seymour High School and Annex: 100 Bank St. (added December 17, 1983)

Media
The Valley Independent Sentinel, an online-only, non-profit news site, launched in June 2009. It covers five towns in the lower Naugatuck Valley, including Seymour.

The Valley Gazette, a weekly print and online newspaper published since 1991, covers three towns in the lower Naugatuck Valley, including Seymour.

Education

There are four public schools in Seymour, Connecticut. They are Seymour High School (9–12), Seymour Middle School (6–8), Chatfield-LoPresti School (Pre-K–5), and Bungay School(K–5). Chatfield School and LoPresti School used to be separate, until they united into one school on the grounds of the former Paul E. Chatfield School. The school opened as one on the first day of school on September 5, 2012. The official dedication occurred on Sunday, October 14, 2012.

Seymour Pink
Seymour Pink is a non-profit organization in Seymour. It is an organization that helps fight against breast cancer. It donates to local hospitals such as Yale's Smilow Cancer Institute and Hewitt's Breast Cancer center at Griffin Hospital. One day in the month of October is "Seymour Pink Day" where the whole town unites and wears pink in hopes of raising money. Seymour High School's sports teams also participate in the fight against breast cancer.  In June 2017, the organization worked with the town's First Selectman Kurt Miller and the town's garbage and recycling company, Winter Bros., to create bright pink recycling bins.  Residents could buy a pink bin to use instead of the traditional blue recycling bins and proceeds were donated to Seymour Pink.

As of 2017, the organization has raised over $1 million.  The funds are used to assist those who are having trouble meeting financial commitments while undergoing treatment for breast cancer.

Infrastructure

Transportation

The Seymour train station provides commuter rail service to Bridgeport, Stamford, and Grand Central Terminal in New York City via the Waterbury Branch on the Metro-North Railroad's New Haven Line. Seymour lies along Connecticut Route 8. Connecticut Transit New Haven Division provides bus service to Seymour on its F West Chapel Street route.

Notable people

 John D'Agostino (born 1982), professional poker player
 Harriet Ford (1868–1949), actress, playwright
 John William De Forest (1826–1906), a soldier and writer best known for his Civil War novel Miss Ravenel's Conversion from Secession to Loyalty
 Carlos French (1835–1903), congressman from Connecticut
 Themis Klarides (born 1965), former Connecticut House Minority Leader, Republican Candidate for the 2022 Connecticut senate election
 Robert Tuttle Morris (1857–1945), surgeon and author
 Alyssa Naeher (born 1988), soccer player

Pictures

See also

References

External links 

 
 Seymour Historical Society
 Derby Historical Society, serving the towns of Ansonia, Derby, Oxford, Seymour, and Shelton
 Seymour, Connecticut, at City-data.com

 
Naugatuck River Valley
Towns in Connecticut
Towns in New Haven County, Connecticut
Towns in the New York metropolitan area